The 1972 UC Davis Aggies football team represented the University of California, Davis as a member of the Far Western Conference (FWC) during the 1972 NCAA College Division football season. Led by third-year head coach Jim Sochor, UC Davis compiled an overall record of 6–2–2 with a mark of 5–0 in conference play, winning the FWC title for the second consecutive season. 1972 was the third consecutive winning season for the Aggies. UC Davis was invited to play in one of the four NCAA College Division regional finals, the Boardwalk Bowl, in the Atlantic City, New Jersey, where the Aggies lost to UMass. The team outscored its opponents 278 to 228 for the season. The Aggies played home games at Toomey Field in Davis, California.

Bob Biggs was selected by the Associated Press as the first-team quarterback on the 1972 Little All-America college football team.

Schedule

References

UC Davis
UC Davis Aggies football seasons
Northern California Athletic Conference football champion seasons
UC Davis Aggies football